Orta Ləki (also, Läki and Orta-Lyaki) is a village and municipality in the Agdash Rayon of Azerbaijan. It has a population of 5,863. The municipality consists of the villages of Orta Ləki and Yuxarı Ləki.

References 

Populated places in Agdash District